is a railway station on the Aoimori Railway Line in the city of Hachinohe in Aomori Prefecture, Japan, operated by the third sector railway operator Aoimori Railway Company.

Lines
Mutsu-Ichikawa Station is served by the Aoimori Railway Line, and is 32.8 kilometers from the terminus of the line at Metoki Station. It is 650.1 kilometers from Tokyo Station.

Station layout
Mutsu Ichikawa Station has a one ground-level island platform and one ground-level side platform serving three tracks connected to the station building by a footbridge. However, only tracks 1 and 3 are in use, and the rails for track 2 have been pulled up, giving the station an effective structure of two opposed side platforms. The small station building is unmanned.

Platforms

History
It was elevated in status to a full station on the Japanese Government Railways (JGR), the pre-war predecessor to the Japan National Railways (JNR), on November 11, 1944 and given its present name at the same time. Regularly scheduled freight services were discontinued in October 1971, and the station has been managed from Hachinohe Station since February 1985. With the privatization of the JNR on April 1, 1987, it came under the operational control of East Japan Railway Company (JR East).

The section of the Tōhoku Main Line including this station was transferred to Aoimori Railway on December 4, 2010. The station has been unattended since 1999.

Surrounding area
JGSDF Camp Hachinohe
JMSDF Hachinohe Air Base

See also
 List of Railway Stations in Japan

References
 JTB Timetable December 2010 issue

External links

 

Railway stations in Aomori Prefecture
Railway stations in Japan opened in 1944
Hachinohe
Aoimori Railway Line